"Ice Cream" is a song by South Korean girl group Blackpink and American singer Selena Gomez. It was released on August 28, 2020, through YG Entertainment and Interscope Records, as the second single from the group's first Korean-language studio album, The Album (2020). The song was written by Selena Gomez, Teddy, Tommy Brown, Ariana Grande, Victoria Monét, Bekuh Boom, 24, Steven Franks, while Brown, Teddy, 24 and Franks produced the song. "Ice Cream" is an electropop and bubblegum pop song with elements of trap. Lyrically, the song mainly consists of ice cream-related double entendres.

"Ice Cream" debuted and peaked at number 13 on the US Billboard Hot 100, becoming Blackpink's first single to peak inside the top-twenty of the chart and subsequently becoming the longest-charting song by an all-female Korean act on the Hot 100. Elsewhere, the song has peaked within the top ten on both Billboard Global 200 and Global Excl. U.S., as well as charts in South Korea, El Salvador, Hungary, Malaysia and Singapore. It also has figured within the record charts in other 22 countries. An official music video for the song was released on August 28, 2020. It was nominated for Best Collaboration at the MTV Europe Music Awards, Music Video of 2020 at the People's Choice Awards, and Best K-Pop at the 2021 MTV Video Music Awards.

Background and release
In an interview for Radio.com, Gomez revealed that she was first introduced to Blackpink after meeting Jisoo and Rosé during New York Fashion Week in 2018, while Blackpink shared that they had been big fans of Gomez's growing up, having danced to her music as trainees.

On July 23, 2020, YG Entertainment released a teaser poster for a new collaboration single between Blackpink and an unnamed artist, set to be released in August. Fans on social media started the "#AriPink" hashtag in hopes that the collaboration would be with singer Ariana Grande. On July 28, the band announced their first Korean studio album, The Album, would be released on October 2, 2020. On August 11, 2020, the unnamed artist was revealed to be American singer Selena Gomez, with Grande later being confirmed as one of the songwriters. Ten days later, it was revealed that the title of the collaboration would be "Ice Cream". On August 24, a teaser video featuring Blackpink and Gomez on video call together while the song played in the background was released. Teaser photos of Blackpink and Gomez were released from August 24 to August 26. The teaser photo of Blackpink member Jisoo was released on August 24, photos of members Jennie and Rosé were released on August 25, and photos of Lisa as well as Gomez were released on August 26. On August 27, 2020, Blackpink released a music video teaser for "Ice Cream".

Upon the song's release, Gomez released an ice cream flavor inspired by the collaboration with Blackpink with Serendipity Ice Cream, in which she has an ownership stake, called "Cookies and Cream Remix".

Composition

"Ice Cream" is an electropop and bubblegum pop song with elements of trap-pop. The song is written in the key of E major with a tempo of 80 beats per minute, while Blackpink's and Gomez's vocals range from the low note of B3 to the high note of E5. The song's lyrics are sung mostly in English, with the exception of a Korean rap verse from Lisa. Lyrically, the song mainly consists of ice cream-related double entendres. Jon Caramanica of The New York Times described "Ice Cream" as "relentlessly bouncy and chipper" and described the singing as "a little playful, a little taunting, a little distant".

Music video

Development and release
On August 27, 2020, Blackpink released an 18-second long teaser clip of the music video for "Ice Cream"; the music video was released a day later on August 28. Both videos were released on the group's official YouTube channel. The music video for "Ice Cream" was directed by frequent director and collaborator Seo Hyun-seung. It garnered 79.08 million views in its first 24 hours, making it the third biggest 24-hour debut for a music video on the platform at the time, and a second personal best for the group behind their June 2020 single "How You Like That", which received 86.3 million views in its first 24 hours. The video debuted at number one on the Global YouTube Music Videos Chart. Behind-the-scenes videos of filming were released separately by Blackpink and Gomez on August 29. Blackpink's scenes were filmed in South Korea, while the scenes featuring Gomez were filmed separately in the United States due to the COVID-19 pandemic.

Synopsis

The music video shows Gomez and Blackpink in a number of colorful sets and outfits. It opens with Gomez in a candy-striped bikini with gold hoop earrings and a white sailor hat, driving a pastel-colored ice cream truck filled with Serendipity Ice Cream. The ice cream truck has the word "Selpink" written on it, a combination of "Selena" and "Blackpink". The members of Blackpink appear next on-screen, popping up smiling behind ice-cream shaped cardboard cutouts. During her first verse, Jennie appears in a blue Care Bears-printed dress, wearing matching blue eyeliner; later in the video, she is joined by a capybara. Blackpink are then shown riding bikes and dancing in a colorful, Candy Land-like cul-de-sac, while Gomez stands outside of the ice cream truck wearing a Puma romper with a green visor. Gomez appears in a polka-dot yellow top with blue culottes for her next verse, standing in front of a wall which reads "Ice Queen" in graffiti. Rosé then appears alongside a golden retriever. Next, Jisoo walks out of a cherry-patterned car parked in a cherry-patterned garage, holding a cherry and wearing cherry-themed accessories with a diadem. For the second chorus, Blackpink dance in a pastel pink tennis court, holding tennis rackets and wearing white tennis skirts and crop tops, while Selena is shown sitting in a Chevrolet, sporting a 1950s pin-up-inspired updo and wearing a yellow plaid off-the-shoulder romper. Blackpink appear in a bright pink ice cream parlor for the second post-chorus, holding ice cream and wearing black-and-white outfits. Blackpink are shown dancing and holding cat ice cream pillows during Lisa's rap verse. As the song closes, Blackpink drive around in metallic pink Mercedes-Benz Power Wheels cars and, in a separate scene, play on a blow-up slide, wearing crochet outfits.

Performance video
On September 2, an animated dance performance version of the music video was released via the group's YouTube channel. In it, Blackpink and Gomez appear as 3-D Zepeto avatars dressed in outfits similar to those worn in the original music video, and virtually team up to perform a dance routine to the song, that also included parts of the original choreography, while surrounded by "suspended ice cream cones" and other related imagery. The video gained over 100 million views.

Accolades

Year-end lists

Commercial performance
In the United States, the song debuted at number 13 on the Billboard Hot 100, surpassing "How You Like That" and "Sour Candy", both of which peaked at number 33, to become Blackpink's highest-charting single in the country. The song also debuted at number two on Billboards Digital Songs chart and at number eight on Billboards Streaming Songs chart, having sold over 23,000 digital copies and having received over 18.3 million streams in its first week of tracking. It also appeared at number 32 on the Billboard Mainstream Top 40 chart after garnering substantial airplay on both contemporary and adult contemporary radio, gaining 5.1 million radio airplay audience impressions during its first week of tracking and marking Blackpink's debut on the chart. The song became the longest-charting song by an all-female Korean act on the Hot 100, after spending eight consecutive weeks on the chart, surpassing their own previous record of four weeks set by "Kill This Love". The song became Gomez's 20th and Blackpink's third top 40 hit in the US. By the end of 2020, the song had reached 126,500,000 streams in the US.

In South Korea, "Ice Cream" debuted at number 51 on the Gaon Digital Chart issue dated August 23–29 with less than two days of tracking. On the next chart issue dated August 30-September 5, the song rose to its peak at number 8. In the United Kingdom, the song debuted at number 39, making Blackpink the first Korean act to achieve five top 40 singles in the country. The song charted in the UK for eight weeks and became the second-longest charting single by a Korean girl group behind Blackpink and Dua Lipa's "Kiss and Make Up". "Ice Cream" also debuted at number eight on the Billboard Global 200 and number six on the Global Excl. U.S. upon the launch of the charts on September 19. The song stayed in the top ten for a second week at number nine on the Global Excl. U.S. on the chart issue dated September 26. In total, "Ice Cream" charted on the Global 200 for 14 weeks and on the Global Excl. U.S. for 22 weeks.

Credits and personnel 
Credits adapted from Melon.

 Blackpink – vocals
 Selena Gomez – vocals, composing
 Teddy – composing, lyricist 
 Tommy Brown – composing, lyricist, arrangement
 24 – composing, arrangement
 Steven Franks – composing, arrangement
 Ariana Grande – composing
 Victoria Monét – composing, lyricist 
 Bekuh Boom – composing, lyricist 
 Serban Ghenea – mixing, studio personnel

Charts

Weekly charts

Monthly charts

Year-end charts

Certifications and sales

Release history

See also 

 List of Inkigayo Chart winners (2020)
 List of K-pop songs on the Billboard charts
 List of most-liked YouTube videos
 List of most-viewed online videos in the first 24 hours

References

2020 singles
2020 songs
Blackpink songs
Selena Gomez songs
Interscope Records singles
YG Entertainment singles
Dance-pop songs
Songs written by Selena Gomez
Songs written by Ariana Grande
Songs written by Victoria Monét
Songs written by Tommy Brown (record producer)
Bubblegum pop songs
English-language South Korean songs
Impact of the COVID-19 pandemic on the music industry